Kolbotn is a railway station located at Kolbotn in Oppegård, Norway. Located 12 km from Oslo S on the Østfold Line, it is served by commuter trains operated by Vy.

As part of the new high-speed the Follo Line between Oslo and Ski, was previously considered as an intermediate station.

References 

Railway stations in Oppegård
Railway stations on the Østfold Line
Railway stations opened in 1895
1895 establishments in Norway